Iris narynensis is a plant species in the genus Iris, it is also in the subgenus of Scorpiris. It is a bulbous perennial.

It was published in Bulletin of the Jardin of St Peterburg's Botanic Garden 159 in 1905.

The name comes from the Naryn River in Kyrgyzstan, where the iris was found.

It is listed in 1995 in Vascular plants of Russia and adjacent states (the former USSR) by Czerepanov, S. K.

Tony Hall published an article about Iris narynensis in Curtis Botanical Magazine in 2007.

Iris narynensis is an accepted name by the Royal Horticultural Society.

It is hardy to United States Department of Agriculture Zones 4-5.

It has been collected and displayed in the Tashkent Botanical Garden.

Habit
Iris narynensis has 1 or 2 dark-violet(or pale violet). It has dark violet falls. The flowers
are up to 7 cm across. It is a very small growing iris, only reaching 5 cm (or 2 in.)

Native
Iris narynensisCorrecting publication info is native to Kyrgyzstan in USSR and Tien Shan Mountains in Central Asia. It has been found in a river canyon at around 600 m above sea level.

References

External links
Image of Iris narynensis

narynensis
Plants described in 1905
Flora of Kyrgyzstan
Flora of Central Asia